Brian Richardson can refer to:

 Brian Richardson (bobsleigh) (born 1955), American Olympic bobsledder
 Brian Richardson (cricketer) (1932–2020), Australian cricketer
 Brian Richardson (rower) (born 1947), Australian Olympic rower
 Brian Richardson (footballer) (born 1934), English footballer

See also
 Bryan Richardson